Émile Parisien (born 12 October 1982) is a French soprano and alto saxophonist, jazz musician, and composer.

Career 
Émile Parisien entered the fifth class at the age of 11 in the first class of Marciac's College de jazz, where he studied music with established musicians such as Pierre Boussaguet, Guy Lafitte and Christian "Tonton" Salut.

From 1996, he studied at the Conservatoire de Toulouse, where he also studied classical and contemporary music. During these years, he has had the opportunity to perform alongside major jazz figures such as Wynton Marsalis, Christian McBride, Johnny Griffin and Bobby Hutcherson, during the Jazz in Marciac festival.

Influences 

Parisien moved to Paris in 2000 and in 2004 founded his own quartet with Julien Touery (piano), Ivan Gélugne (double bass), and Sylvain Darrifourcq (drums). With compositions inspired by Hector Berlioz, Igor Stravinski, Arnold Schönberg, Richard Wagner, as well as John Coltrane and Wayne Shorter, this quartet gives an expressionist character to his music, where improvisation takes precedence.

Parisien performs in France and internationally with, among others, Michel Portal, Jacky Terrasson, Yaron Herman, Joachim Kühn, Stéphane Kerecki, John Taylor, Éric Serra, Paco Sery, Rémi Vignolo, Manu Codjia, Anne Paceo, Daniel Humair, Jean-Paul Céléa, Vincent Peirani.

Awards 
 June 2017 Echo Jazz (Germany), category international instrumentalist
 Artist of the year at the Victoires du Jazz 2014
 Winner of the Prix Django Reinhardt 2012 awarded 15 January 2013 by the Académie du Jazz
 Winner at the Victoires du Jazz 2009 in the Révélation Instrumentale Française de l'Année (Prix Frank Ténot) category
 In 2007, Émile Parisien is elected Talent Jazz of the Fonds d'Action Sacem for three consecutive years; with this support, the Quartet recorded two records at Laborie Jazz in 2007: Au Revoir Porc-épic, and in 2009, Original Pimpant, both unanimously hailed by generalist and specialized critics.
 Winner of the program Jazzmigration of the AFIJMA (Association des Festivals Innovants en Jazz et Musiques Actuelles) in 2009.
 Winner Jazz Primeur 2009, awarded by Culturesfrance, deputy operator of the Ministry of Foreign Affairs and the Ministry of Culture for international cultural exchanges.

Discography 
As leader or co-leader
 Émile Parisien Quintet: Éphémère (2000 – CD auto-produit Famimra)
 Émile Parisien 4tet: Au revoir porc-épic (2006 – )
 Émile Parisien 4tet: Original pimpant (2009 – Laborie)
 Émile Parisien 4tet: Chien Guêpe (2012 – Laborie)
 Émile Parisien 4tet: Spezial Snack (2014 – ACT)
 Émile Parisien and Vincent Peirani: Belle Époque (2014 – ACT)
 Émile Parisien Quintet feat. Joachim Kühn: Sfumato (2016 – ACT)
 Émile Parisien Quintet feat. Joachim Kühn: Sfumato live in Marciac (2018 – ACT)
 Émile Parisien Quartet: Double Screening (2019 – ACT)
 Émile Parisien and Vincent Peirani: Abrazo (2020 – ACT)
 Émile Parisien Sextet: Louise (2022 – ACT)

As sideman
 Daniel Humair: Sweet and Sour (2012 – Laborie)
 Jean-Paul Céléa: Yes Ornette (2012 – Out Note Records)
 Yaron Herman: Alter Ego (2012 – ACT)
 Gueorgui Kornazov 5tet: Sila (2013 – BMC)
 Hugo Carvalhais: Particula (2013 – Clean Feed Records)
 Romain Cuoq - Anthony Jambon 5tet: Awake (2013 – Cristal Records)
 Stéphane Kerecki: Nouvelle Vague (2014 – Out Note Records)
 Vincent Peirani 5tet: Living Being (2015 – ACT)
 Jan Lundgren: Into the Night (2021 – ACT)

References

External links 

 Serge Loupien, Émile Parisien, élève devenu maître, Libération
 Émile Parisien on France Musique
 Émile Parisien on France Culture
 Émile Parisien on Le Triton

French jazz saxophonists
Male saxophonists
French jazz composers
Male jazz composers
1982 births
People from Cahors
Living people
21st-century saxophonists
21st-century French male musicians
ACT Music artists